The Parsonage is a historic home located at Oak Hill in Greene County, New York.  The house was built about 1815 and is a two-story, heavy timber framed, five bay gable roofed dwelling modified about 1840 and about 1870.  Also on the property is a carriage barn with board and batten siding.  From 1868 to 1973 it served as the parsonage for the nearly Methodist Episcopal church.

It was listed on the National Register of Historic Places in 2005.

See also
National Register of Historic Places listings in Greene County, New York

References

Houses on the National Register of Historic Places in New York (state)
Houses in Greene County, New York
Clergy houses in the United States
National Register of Historic Places in Greene County, New York
History of New York (state)